The following is the list of telenovelas produced by Univision Communications.

Telenovelas order home recordings

1990s

2000s

2010s-present

References 

 
Univision
Univision telenovelas